Hurley is a city in Turner County, South Dakota, United States. The population was 379 at the 2020 census.

History
Hurley was platted in 1883. It was named for R. E. Hurley, a railroad engineer. A post office has been in operation in Hurley since 1883.

Geography

Hurley is located at  (43.282397, -97.088463).

Hurley has been assigned the ZIP code 57036 and the FIPS place code 30980.

Demographics

2010 census
At the 2010 census there were 415 people in 179 households, including 120 families, in the city. The racial makup of the city was 97.1% White, 0.2% African American, 1.0% Native American, and 1.7% from two or more races. Hispanic or Latino of any race were 2.4%.

Of the 179 households 30.7% had children under the age of 18 living with them, 52.5% were married couples living together, 10.6% had a female householder with no husband present, 3.9% had a male householder with no wife present, and 33.0% were non-families. 30.2% of households were one person and 12.8% were one person aged 65 or older. The average household size was 2.32 and the average family size was 2.82.

The median age was 35.9 years. 27% of residents were under the age of 18; 6.6% were between the ages of 18 and 24; 26.7% were from 25 to 44; 23.9% were from 45 to 64; and 15.9% were 65 or older. The gender makeup of the city was 49.4% male and 50.6% female.

2000 census
At the 2000 census there were 426 people in 187 households, including 123 families, in the city. The population density was 690.4 people per square mile (265.3/km). There were 206 housing units at an average density of 333.8 per square mile (128.3/km).  The racial makup of the city was 99.77% White and 0.23% Asian. Hispanic or Latino of any race were 0.23%.

Of the 187 households 27.8% had children under the age of 18 living with them, 54.5% were married couples living together, 8.6% had a female householder with no husband present, and 33.7% were non-families. 30.5% of households were one person and 17.1% were one person aged 65 or older. The average household size was 2.28 and the average family size was 2.82.

The age distribution was 23.0% under the age of 18, 6.6% from 18 to 24, 25.6% from 25 to 44, 24.2% from 45 to 64, and 20.7% 65 or older. The median age was 41 years. For every 100 females, there were 86.0 males. For every 100 females age 18 and over, there were 85.3 males.

The median household income was $35,313 and the median family income  was $47,083. Males had a median income of $29,737 versus $21,484 for females. The per capita income for the city was $18,319. About 4.9% of families and 7.2% of the population were below the poverty line, including none of those under age 18 and 14.0% of those age 65 or over.

References

External links
 Viborg-Hurley School District
 www.hurleysd.com

Cities in South Dakota
Cities in Turner County, South Dakota
Sioux Falls, South Dakota metropolitan area
Populated places established in 1883
1883 establishments in Dakota Territory